Acropolitis rudisana is a moth of the family Tortricidae. It is widespread in eastern Australia.

The wingspan is about 17 mm. The forewings are grey, with fuscous markings and irrorations (speckles). The hindwings are grey.

The larvae feed on Vitis, Acacia, Arctotheca, Chrysanthemum, Hakea, Helichrysum, Malus, Pinus, Populus, Pyracantha and Rumex species, as well as Dillwynia retorta, Dimocarpus longan, Humulus lupulus, Medicago sativa, Rubus loganobaccus and Trifolium repens.

References

External links
Australian Faunal Directory
Acropolitis excelsa at tortricidae.com
Tortricidae Foodplant database

Archipini
Moths described in 1863
Moths of Australia
Taxa named by Francis Walker (entomologist)